Knevichi railway station is a railway station in Artyom, Russia. The station building is directly connected to Vladivostok International Airport.

Trains
Only Aeroexpress departs at this station. Aeroexpress connects this station and Vladivostok Railway Station in 54 minutes. However, Aeroexpress train are operated only five trains per day.

References

Airport railway stations in Russia